The men's sanshou 70 kilograms competition at the 2008 Beijing Wushu Tournament was held from 22 to 24 August at the Olympic Sports Center Gymnasium.

Schedule 
All times are Beijing Time (UTC+08:00)

Results

References 

Men's_sanshou_70_kg